Loricariichthys platymetopon is a species of catfish in the family Loricariidae. It is native to South America, where it occurs in the Río de la Plata basin in Argentina, Brazil, and Paraguay. The species reaches maturity at around 15.7 cm (6.2 inches) in length, although it can grow up to 39 cm (15.4 inches) in total length. It can reach at least 311 g in weight and is believed to be a facultative air-breather.

Loricariichthys platymetopon is known to have a diploid number of 2n = 54 and a ZW sex-determination system.

References 

Loricariini
Taxobox binomials not recognized by IUCN
Fish described in 1979
Catfish of South America